Promo Azteca (AZTECA, originally known as Promotora Mexicana de Lucha Libre, PROMELL) was a professional wrestling promotion that was founded in Tijuana, Mexico, by Fuerza Guerrera in 1995. It was taken over by Konnan and Jorge Rojas the following year and was home to many of the luchadors wrestling for World Championship Wrestling (WCW) during the late-1990s.

Promo Azteca sought to become the third national wrestling promotion in Mexico with the support of Televisión Azteca, the country's second-largest television network; however, WCW eventually withdrew its support and banned luchadors under WCW contract from working for Promo Azteca. Promo Azteca was unable to recover from this loss and closed at the end of 1998.

History
Promo Azteca had its origins in 1995 under the Promotora Mexicana de Lucha Libre banner owned by Fuerza Guerrera. Guerrera initially co-promoted shows with AAA until selling the company that same year to Konnan, Jorge Rojas and the TV Azteca network. In October 1996, Konnan left AAA after a falling out with owner Antonio Pena and brought a number of its younger stars with him including, most notably, Juventud Guerrera, Rey Misterio Jr., Super Calo, La Parka and Psicosis.

Many were competing in World Championship Wrestling's (WCW) new cruiserweight division at the time and shared much of Konnan's frustrations with AAA's management over money. These luchadors were on limited contracts in WCW which meant they were paid only for the nights they worked rather than receiving a yearly salary. Once leaving the AAA, however, this left them with a lot of spare time and few opportunities to work in Mexico. One of the key reasons Konnan took over Promo Azteca was to establish a place where he and other luchadors could compete when they were not wrestling in the United States. WCW agreed to let those under contract continue wrestling in their native country when they were not needed at live events. He and Rojas envisioned these wrestlers as Promo Azteca's main stars.

Notable talent
In addition to the former AAA talent that followed Konnan to Promo Azteca, older veterans such as Angel Azteca, Blue Panther, Cien Caras, Máscara Año 2000 and Universo Dos Mil were also involved. In early 1997, Konnan formed a version of the New World Order with Damián 666, Halloween, Psicosis and Los Villanos (Villano IV and Villano V). Other WCW luchadors to regularly appear in Promo Azteca included El Dandy, Hector Garza, Lizmark Jr. and Norman Smiley.

The promotion featured a number of then-unknown wrestlers who would become major stars in Mexico and the United States during the next decade, including Ephesto (then known as Pantera del Ring), Mr. Águila, Toscano, Último Guerrero, Último Rebelde, and El Zorro. Super Crazy, in particular, was considered the standout star of its cruiserweight division. He rose to prominence during a feud with Venum Black, which culminated on March 6, 1997 in a "mask vs. hair" Lucha de Apuestas, or "bet match", that Super Crazy won, and later found success in the U.S. with Extreme Championship Wrestling (ECW).

Some visiting Japanese wrestlers made their first appearances in Mexico with Promo Azteca such as CIMA, Kaz Hayashi and Yoshihiro Tajiri.

Style and television
Promo Azteca was presented as a "rebel" wrestling promotion, similar to Extreme Championship Wrestling in the United States. It is notable for introducing "hardcore wrestling" and other elements of American-style pro wrestling to Mexican audiences. One of these, the one-fall match, was later adopted by AAA. Promo Azteca had the support of TV Azteca, one of the largest networks in Mexico, and from which the promotion's name was derived. TV Azteca was eager to compete against Televisa, which aired both AAA and CMLL television programming. Its American counterpart ECW, on the other hand, struggled for years to secure a spot on a U.S. television network. Promo Azteca's televised events aired weekly on Friday nights from October 1996 to March 1998. Promo Azteca TV was reportedly set to resume after the 1998 FIFA World Cup, but the show did not return to television. Though it did not air in the U.S., the series was covered by the Wrestling Observer Newsletter.

Role in the Mexican and U.S. promotional wars
At the time of Promo Azteca's founding, a major promotional war was being fought between Mexico's two major promotions: AAA and Consejo Mundial de Lucha Libre (CMLL). The emergence of a "renegade" promotion such as Promo Azteca added to an already chaotic situation in the world of lucha libre. Promo Azteca enjoyed an exclusive partnership with World Championship Wrestling, partially due to Konnan's involvement in developing WCW's cruiserweight division. This encouraged many luchadors to defect from AAA and CMLL in the hopes of working for the U.S. promotion. Kevin Quinn, Steele, Super Astro and The Headhunters were among CMLL talent to jump to Promo Azteca. When La Parka, Máscara Sagrada and other luchador enmascarados left AAA for Promo Azteca, however, the promotion countered by having other wrestlers portray the originals resulting in two versions wrestling on national television. The departure of La Parka was an especially serious setback for AAA and he was later blackballed by the promotion. According to Konnan, he and other AAA stars were also denied work by promoters upon returning to Mexico in 2001.

Promo Azteca also had a role in the U.S. promotional rivalry between WCW and the World Wrestling Federation. Konnan, convincing many of WCW's interest showcasing lucha libre-style wrestling, was able to lure Mexican talent away from the WWF's fledgling cruiserweight division. Víctor Quiñones, a key figure in the CMLL-WWF talent exchange agreement, jumped to Promo Azteca in September 1997. That same month, WCW President Eric Bischoff brokered a meeting with Konnan and rival CMLL promoter Paco Alonzo. Bischoff, interested in CMLL's talent and association with Televsia, was reportedly unable to negotiate a truce between the two men. Konnan was also upset over Mike Tenay filming CMLL wrestlers that summer for a series of documentary shorts on Mexican wrestling. It was speculated by the Pro Wrestling Torch that WCW's interest in CMLL was partly motivated by curbing the power of Konnan's crew of Mexican talent in WCW.

Demise
For a brief time, Promo Azteca's superior talent and backing from TV Azteca threatened to overtake both AAA and CMLL as the Mexico's top lucha libre promotion. In November 1997, Pro Wrestling Illustrated ranked Promo Azteca among the top promotions in the world. However, its success was short-lived. WCW, fearing its luchadors would become injured, withdrew its support and banned those under contract from working in Promo Azteca. Konnan's wrestling career in the U.S. also prevented him from devoting his full attention to Promo Azteca. The promotion struggled for a while longer, largely relying on regulars in the Mexican independent wrestling scene, but was ultimately unable to recover from losing the WCW luchadors. It held a few interpromotional shows with CMLL before quietly closing its doors at the end of 1998.

Alumni

Male wrestlers

Female wrestlers

Mini-Estrella wrestlers

Stables and tag teams

Managers and valets

Other personnel

Footnotes
 – Entries without a birth name may indicate it is not a matter of public record, as is often the case with masked wrestlers in Mexico where their private lives are kept a secret from the wrestling fans.

Championships and programming

Championships
Promo Azteca promoted championships

Championships recognized by Promo Azteca

Programming

See also

List of professional wrestling promotions in Mexico

References

Specific

General

Further reading

External links
Promo Azteca at Cagematch.net
Promo Azteca at Wrestlingdata.com

Mexican professional wrestling promotions
1995 establishments in Mexico
1998 disestablishments in Mexico